This article provides a list of Olympic athletes from the University of Oregon. The athletes listed have both competed in either the Summer Olympic Games or the Winter Olympic Games and have attended the University of Oregon. The vast majority of Olympic athletes from Oregon competed in the Oregon Ducks track and field team.

Summer Olympics

Winter Olympics

References

Oregon, University of
University of Oregon
Olympic
University of Oregon